Czesław Uznański (7 December 1930 – 19 March 2014) was a Polish footballer. He played in three matches for the Poland national football team in 1956.

References

External links
 

1930 births
2014 deaths
Polish footballers
Poland international footballers
Association footballers not categorized by position